Every Witch Way is a telenovela-formatted teen sitcom that originally aired on Nickelodeon from January 1, 2014, to July 30, 2015.

The first season aired as a "One Month Event", where the first 20-episode season aired every weeknight in January 2014. On March 13, 2014, Nickelodeon announced that they had commissioned a second season of Every Witch Way, that aired from July 7 to August 8. On July 31, 2014, Nickelodeon renewed the show for a third season, which premiered on January 5, 2015. On February 25, 2015, Nickelodeon renewed the show for a fourth season and announced a spin-off titled WITS Academy. It was announced on June 1, 2015, that the fourth season would be the final season. The series finale aired on July 30, 2015, with WITS Academy announced as its spinoff show following its conclusion to air in fall 2015. WITS Academy premiered on October 5, 2015, but was later canceled after one season.

Series overview

Season 1
Emma Alonso moves with her father Francisco to the suburbs of Miami, Florida, where she attends Iridium High. She later learns that she is a witch, and is also the "Chosen One", having great powers and abilities of her generation. Emma barely makes it through the school year with the help of Lily, the school nurse who is Emma's guardian; Andi Cruz, her best friend; Daniel Miller, a mutual crush, and the rest of the Sharks, Iridium High's swim team. There are obstacles along the way, too, including Maddie Van Pelt, the leader of the Panthers, a trio of the school's most popular girls, who is a newly profound witch and Daniel's ex-girlfriend, and the principal, Miss Torres, who is a 400-year-old witch and the old Chosen One. During the upcoming eclipse, she plans on taking Emma's powers, but fails after Maddie and Emma join forces, despite their differences, and send her away using a spell from the Hexoren, a book of spells that Emma inherited from her late mother. At the end of the season, Daniel and Emma become a couple; also, after defeating the principal, both witches think they lost their powers, but in reality, Emma still has them, and she keeps this a secret from Daniel in season 2.

Season 2
It is a new year at Iridium high. The Witches' Council, the head of the magic realm has come to tell Emma that she cannot date Daniel because he is a human and witches and humans cannot date; the only way she can date him is to give up her powers and become human, as her mother did to be with Francisco. But because of her title as the "Chosen One," Emma cannot do that, and at the same time, she doesn't want to go in the other direction. Maddie, who lost her powers at the end of the first season, refuses to accept this, so Sophie and Katie, the other Panthers, try to make her believe that she still has her powers with the help of Diego, a Churi Kanay (someone who has powers over the elements). The only reason Diego does this is because he hopes that she will notice him more. The truth is that Maddie's mother, Ursula, received her powers and is using them in attempt to make Francisco fall in love with her. Eventually, Maddie gets her powers back in the middle of the season and feels happy. During the season, Maddie and Diego realize that they have feelings for each other. In the season 2 finale, Diego gets Maddie out of a black hole and they kiss. After that, they start dating. Jax Novoa, a new student from Sydney, Australia, arrives at Iridium High and becomes the school's new heartthrob. Francisco has been promoted to the position as new principal and assigns Emma to help show Jax around. While doing so, she has no suspicions that he is a wizard, but she soon learns it later. Andi and Daniel are suspicious of him, but Jax, who has a mysterious past, shuts everyone out and starts to have feelings for Emma. While almost everyone is blinded by his bad side, Emma sees his vulnerable side, too, and she slowly starts to fall for him. Then there's the Fool Moon, a moon that occurs every twenty years and causes witches and wizards' powers to act oddly. The Fool Moon affects Desdemona, one member of the Witches' Council, who becomes evil and plans to take Emma's powers; also, Jax and E (Emma's evil clone who was made after Jax showed Emma a new cloning spell), plan to do so, but E is defeated before she could. At the end of season two, Jax reforms, and he, Daniel, and Emma get along.

Season 3
Summer is almost over for the Iridium High 
students. Emma is working as a waitress at the Beachside Seven, the gang's new hangout spot, while Daniel works as a life guard there as well. Andi is determined to prove herself to the council and become a guardian, Jax is sent to Rebel Boot Camp, and Maddie and Diego try to fix the relationship between witches and kanays, who warred with each other in the past. A new girl named Mia Black moves to Miami to take revenge on all witches because Principal Torres killed her parents. Mia, who is a kanay like Diego, plans to destroy Emma and Maddie with the help of the Cristal de Caballero, a sacred gem of the Kanays used to makes a witches' power go haywire.  Mia puts a spider seal on Daniel, making him evil and turn against Emma.  Mia and Diego get into a kanay duel, resulting with Diego being under Mia's control temporarily .  Andi's zombie and he also likes to have the decikd tango with Max's boyfriend, Phillip, gets out of the game with Hex's help.  Desdemona and Agememnon try to overthrow Emma, while she tries to change Phillip into a human, using a forbidden spell. Emma and Mia get sucked into the game and have to work together to get out of there.  At the end of the season finale, Emma has to make a decision, either to be with Jax or Daniel and she chooses Jax.

Season 4
Emma's decision to be with Jax triggers a Continuum Break on Daniel, where he shifts into a different life in the Everglades, and everyone except for Emma forgets who he is. Emma and the gang travel to the Everglades to take Daniel back to Miami to restore his memory, but Emma's explanation of the Continuum Break limits the time to have his memory restored to only five days, or else he'll disappear from existence forever, and Emma will not remember him as well. In the crossover with Talia in the Kitchen, Talia Parra's magic spices gave Daniel some of his memory back (only up until the day he and Emma met), but a kiss with Emma finally ends the Continuum Break, giving his entire memory back. However, in the finale, Emma realizes how Daniel misses his other life in the Everglades and triggers the Continuum Break again to make him happy.

Also in the season, Emma starts to miss her mom and wants her back, so she searches for a time manipulation spell so she can go back in time to save her mom. She steals the powers of other witches (the council, Maddie, the principal, and E), while also becoming more reckless with her powers and causing her friends to become mad at her. Eventually in the finale, she realizes her error and gives Maddie and the Council their powers back and changes her mind about traveling back in time.

Meanwhile, Jax's father, Jake, arrives at his home. This leads Jax to soon learn more about his family, as he meets his powerless long-lost sister, Jessie, who soon reveals that his mom, Liana, isn't dead. Jax believed that Jake was evil, but near the end of season 4, it is revealed that Liana is the actual evil witch. In the series finale, Jessie finally gets her powers, and with her help, Emma, Andi and Jax finally defeat Liana, who gets sucked through the portal into Limbo.

At the end of the finale. Emma and Andi visit the Novoas, with Jake saying that Jessie, now that she has her powers, will soon be attending the WITS Academy to learn how to use them. Then, after they see Daniel one last time in the Everglades, Emma announces that Andi will attend the WITS Academy as well to train to finally become a guardian. Andi packs (with Emma giving her the Hex), they arrive at school, and the series ends with Andi leaving through the portal for the academy, leading up to the Every Witch Way spin-off series.

Cast and characters

Main
 Paola Andino as Emma Alonso: A new student at Iridium High, Emma is the main character of the series, and also a witch. She's the Chosen One, the most powerful witch, and her guardian is Lily, the school nurse. Her best friend is Andi, who wants to be her guardian one day. In season 3, she is a waitress at the Beachside Seven and becomes more independent with her powers. In the season 3 finale, she has to decide whom to be with: Jax or Daniel, but she chooses Jax over Daniel, which triggers a Continuum Break on Daniel in season 4. During the Break, Emma is the only one to remember Daniel, and she tries to restore his memory, but triggers the Break again in the series finale to make him happy. Emma also wanted to turn back time in season 4 to bring back her mom. However, she eventually realizes that it wasn't a good idea. Emma is still dating Jax at the end of the series.
 Nick Merico as Daniel Miller:  An athletic student at Iridium High and former- member of the Sharks. At the beginning, he has had a constant on-and-off relationship with Maddie Van Pelt despite holding an interest in Emma. Eventually, he fully breaks up with Maddie and begins to date Emma. He is also a human, not a wizard, thus making the Witch's Council pressure Emma into breaking up with him in season 2. He has a rivalry with Jax over Emma. In season 3, he is a lifeguard at the Beachside Seven, and soon gets Mia as his partner. This leads to her sending a spider bite him, making his 'inner wild' come out. Later, Mia removes the spider from Daniel because it made him very sick. At the end of season 3, Emma chooses Jax over Daniel, making a Continuum Break shift Daniel into another life in a sanctuary by the Everglades. Emma tries to restore his memory, but sends him back in the series finale to make him happy.
 Paris Smith as Maddie Van Pelt:  A witch who is the school's most popular student and head of a best friend group called The Panthers. She hated Emma in season 1 because she stole Daniel from her, but they become friends after everything they went through and because she soon develops feelings for Diego, who she ends up dating. She is the most fashionable girl at Iridium. She can come off as mean, but has a soft side and really cares about her friends and family.
 Daniela Nieves as Andi Cruz:  Emma's best friend, a tomboy who is a member of the Sharks. Other than Emma, Emma's magical flying spell book, the Hexoren, is as well her best friend, often babysitting him and bringing him to school and even the beach. She is great with tools and stands as one of the few able to block spells (using various devices of her creation). She also starts to become friends with Jax. In season 2, her virtual zombie boyfriend, Philip, comes out of the Zombie Apocalypse game; by season 3, he returns again and stays for good. She is the only human known that can understand the Hexoren. At the end of the series, Andi sets off to train to become a guardian at the WITS Academy.
 Rahart Adams as Jax Novoa: A new student in season 2, who is a member of the Sharks and a rebel wizard who is impulsive with his powers, using them for his own interests in season 2. In season 2, he uses Emma to gain magic energy and take over the realm. She soon breaks up with him after Daniel shared a kiss with her. However, in season 3 and 4 he starts to use his powers not only for himself, but for other people. In season 3 Emma has to make a tough decision over whom to be with: Jax or Daniel. She chooses Jax and they stay together for all of season 4 happily. In season 4, Jax's world is turned upside down when he meets his long lost sister Jessie and she reveals that his mother isn't dead. When he figures out she is an evil witch trying to steal Emma's powers and take over the realm with him and Jessie, he remains loyal to Emma and gets Liana transported to Limbo. Limbo is a place where bad witches go and their bad souls are with them.
 Tyler Alvares as Diego Rueda:  Gigi's twin brother and Sharks member. He thought he was the last of the Churi Kanay (meaning "Son of Fire", who can control the elements), until Mia, a rebel Kanay, comes to Miami. His family owns The Seven, as well as the Beachside 7, and he is seen often working there. In season 2, he has an interest in Maddie, but Ursula does not approve, so he tries to impress Maddie in every way that he can. In season 3, Diego and Maddie are a couple, and they try to fix the bond between witches and Kanays. In season 4, Ursula starts liking Diego when he saves the Van Pelt Reunion from Jake.
 Elizabeth Elias as Mia Black: A new girl in season 3. She is a rebel Kanay who wants all witches to be destroyed because one of them, who happens to be the Principal, killed her parents. Unlike Diego, she has been raised as Kanay since her birth so she wields her powers with a much greater ease and skill than Diego. She starts to actually fall for Daniel along the way through her scheme. Mia has a spider Kanay mark on her arm, which causes the persons 'inner wild' to come out. Mia also had the Cristal de Caballero, a magical crystal that belonged to her father. Like Jax in season 2, Mia changed after bonding with Emma in the Zombie Apocalypse video game they got trapped in during the season 3 finale. In season 4, the Continuum Break affects Mia as well, and she is Daniel's girlfriend in his other life in the Everglades.
 Denise Wilson as Katie Rice:  Member of the Panthers and one of Maddie's best friends. She wants to be the head Panther. Even though she acts popular, she is actually smart, and as well happens to have a 'geek side' where she would often refer to different fantasy and anime shows or games and LARPing. In season 3, Katie leaves the Panthers and becomes friend with Mia, although it was revealed she only did so to get information out of her.
 Autumn Wendel as Sophie Johnson:  Member of the Panthers and another one of Maddie's best friends. She is a little dimwitted and very gullible. Other than Emma (and now Andi), she is one of the only characters to tolerate Jax.
 Zoey Burger as Gigi Rueda: Diego's twin sister, school news reporter known as "Miss Information". In season 2, because of a spell, Gigi becomes Desdemona's minion, but is freed by Jax and E (Evil Emma) later on. In season 3, she is a waitress at the Beachside Seven, but blogs more than works. She is kept out of the loop of the magic going around in Miami, even after finding out, quickly having her memory erased by Maddie, several times. She had a small crush on Jax when he first came to the school. Since Daniel (Mia in disguise) treated her nicely, she had a big crush on him as well.
Kendall Ryan Sanders as Tony Myers:  A mathlete, amateur magician, and member of the Sharks, had a crush on Emma. He did not return for the second season because he is attending a "magic academy".
 Maverick Moreno as Mac Davis:  Member of the Sharks and Diego's best friend who doesn't shower. He did not return for the second season due to moving to Texas.

Recurring
 Melissa Carcache as Lily Archer: The school's nurse and Emma's guardian witch, she is powerless and depends on a magic kit. She becomes a member of the Witches' Council in season 2. In season 3, when Jax graduated from Rebels Boot Camp, it seemed that his father was no longer qualified to be his guardian, so Lily was assigned to him.
 Louis Tomeo as Robert Miller: Daniel's brother who is the oldest and leader of the Terrible 3 (T3) and their best inventor.
 Jackie Frazey as Melanie Miller: Daniel's sister who is the middle child and only girl of the Terrible 3 as well as the smartest. She was only seen in Season 4 for 1 episode.
 Jason Ian Drucker as Tommy Miller: Daniel's brother who is the youngest of the Terrible 3 and most hyperactive.
 Katie Barbieri as Ursula Van Pelt: Maddie's mother who holds feelings for Francisco. In season 2, Maddie's powers lands on her, and she uses them to make Francisco fall in love with her, though they finally kiss in the series finale. Ursula doesn't like Diego because he is a Kanay, and doesn't accept him and Maddie dating; however, she finally accepts Diego when he saves the Van Pelt family reunion from Jake. Ursula also wants to prove herself as a hero to the council. Ursula is head of the Van Pelt Coven. In season 3, she adopts Philip.
 Rene Lavan as Francisco Alonso: Emma's father; he becomes Iridium High's principal in season 2 due to former Principal Torres's defeat in the first season. He dislikes Daniel and he likes Jax. He does not know that Emma is a witch, though his wife was one. Francisco also has a hard time talking about his wife with Emma. He and Ursula kiss in the season 4 finale: although shown to not have feelings for her, he makes it clear that he does when he returns the kiss.
 Mia Matthew's as Desdemona: Desdemona is a member of the Witches Council and Emma's new Guardian in season 2 while Lily is in training. In the season, the Fool Moon turns her evil, having her bent on destroying the magic world, but she is changed back to normal by the last light. She does not approve of Emma dating Daniel at first. She is the smartest of the council.
 Todd Allen Durkin as Agamemnon: Leader of the Witches' Council, he is the only wizard in the council, and the supervisor of Rebels Boot Camp in season 3. He has a grand disliking for Jax. In season 4, he and the rest of the Council become powerless because Emma steals their powers, but they get them back in the finale. He becomes the headmaster of the WITs Academy in the spin-off with the same name.
 Whitney Goin as Christine Miller: Daniel's mother.
 Rafael de la Fuente as Coach Julio:  Adopted son of the Principal and the coach of the Sharks, who is revealed to be a frog turned into a human.
 Jimmie Bernal as Rick Miller: Daniel's father. He left after season 1.
 Lisa Corrado as Ramona: Third member of the Witches' Council, she is held in Limbo by Desdemona until the end of the second season, when she is freed by Maddie and Diego. She did not return in season 3.
 Richard Lawrence-O'Brian as Jake Novoa: Jax's father, he is a charming yet dangerous wizard who is obsessed with power. He seems evil, but he's just looking out for his kids. He is first introduced in season 2 when Jax is video chatting Jake. In season 4, Jake comes to Miami.
 Julia Antonelli as Jessie Novoa: Jax's long-lost younger sister who is introduced in season 4. Jessie didn't have powers at the beginning, but she finally gets them in the series finale, thus leading her to attend the WITs Academy to learn how to use them.
 Betty Monroe as Liana Woods/Novoa: Jax and Jessie's mother that was supposedly dead. She says that Jake is bad, but she has a secret of her own. Jake soon reveals that Liana is a witch. Liana was first introduced in season 2 when Jax was talking about her.
 Liam Obergfoll as Philip Van Pelt: Andi's zombie boyfriend from a video game she hacked. He appeared in season 2, but was sent back because he was dangerous. He can understand what the Hexoren is saying, although not many people do. By season 3, he returns and Ursula adopts him, making him a Van Pelt. He is also turned into a human boy by Emma. He was only shown once in season 4 due to the actor playing Tyson Fucinelli on Talia in the Kitchen.
 Ethan Estrada as Oscar: Diego and Gigi's cousin. A new character on season 3. Member of the H2O, a new group similar to the Terrible 3, he and his brother Hector had the T3 framed many times for doing their (the H2O's) pranks, but they were pranked in the season 3 finale.
 Nicolas James as Hector: Diego and Gigi's cousin. Oscar's younger brother and member of the H2O, a new group similar to the Terrible 3, he and his brother Oscar had the T3 framed many times for doing their (the H2O's) pranks, but they were pranked in the season 3 finale.
 Demetrius Daniels as Sebastian: Gigi's cameraman. In the season 2 finale, Jax turns him into a mouse when he went to the school to get a book from his locker. In season 3, Daniel gives Mia his locker and it is unknown if he ever got it back. Gigi once started a rumor about him dating Heather B, and later revealed that he has a girlfriend in season 4. Sebastian is shown to be very kind, as when Emma took his earbuds and phone in a panic, he allowed her with no questions asked.
 Violet Green as Evil Emma "E": Emma's evil and rebellious clone. She was Jax's girlfriend and tricked him so he could help her destroy the magic realm and become the only witch alive, but Jax betrayed her and the real Emma shoved her and got her stuck in the portal to Limbo. When the Principal was brought back by Emma in the series finale, E followed along, returning as well. As a Chosen One clone, she has as much power as her creator. Tougher than the other Emma's clones, Emma had to fuse with her in Season 4 finale to prevent her to come back.
 Michele Verdi as Principal Torres: The principal of Iridium High in season 1 and main antagonist who wanted the Chosen One's powers, but was dispatched in that season's finale. She is seen in a flashback in season 3 when she destroyed the Cristal de Cabarello and killed Mia's parents. A former Chosen One, she is the only character known to have killed other characters. She returns in season 4 so Emma can take her powers away.
 no voice as The Hexoren: A sentient book of spells, nicknamed "Hex". He can fly, open up to a specific page on command, and somewhat communicate. Hex was first of the mother of Emma, but since she is dead Emma has the book. Hex is best friends with Andi, although he belongs to Emma, and in the series finale, Emma gives Andi the book to take with her to the WITs Academy, and there the friendship is continued between Andi and Hex

Broadcast
Every Witch Way premiered on July 7, 2014, on YTV in Canada and on July 14, 2014, on Nickelodeon in the United Kingdom and Ireland. In Australia, the series debuted on August 4, 2014, on Nickelodeon. The second season premiered on February 9, 2015. The first series also started broadcast on Irish channel RTÉ 2 in April 2015.

DVD releases

Reception

Critical
After a few episodes, Emily Ashby of Common Sense Media gave the show 2 stars, saying that Every Witch Way "devotes too much time and energy to Maddie's superficiality and spite to be considered a likable choice for this impressionable age group. And since none of Maddie's actions ever land her in hot water she can't work a spell to escape, kids never see her learn a lesson." She also notes it "suffers from some subpar acting and a low-budget look and feel, and the absence of even a laugh track", leaving it "unusually flat for a tween sitcom. And without the bells and whistles kids tend to like in their entertainment, there's nothing to distract them from the excessive superficiality and pettiness that plague many of the central characters".

Ratings
The premiere episode had an estimated 2.10 million viewers. The second episode drew 2.86 million viewers, giving a large increase in audience. The season one finale on January 30, 2014, had 2.60 million viewers, while the first season had a total average of 2.166 million viewers, and a top rating for the 4-11 demographic.

The season 2 episodes drew numerous viewers, however, its eighth episode, drew 1.71 million viewers, The one hour season two finale on August 8, 2014, had 1.70 million viewers, giving the second season a total average of 1.696 million viewers. The Spellbound special, which premiered on November 26, 2014, had 1.58 million viewers, earning a top rating in season 2 for the 18-49 demographic.

The season 3 premiere had 1.66 million viewers. The second episode of season 3 had 1.54 million viewers, causing a small drop until the third episode, which drew 1.56 million viewers. The season 3 finale drew 1.71 million viewers.

Season 4 premiered with 1.50 million viewers. The crossover with Talia in the Kitchen drew 1.16 million viewers during its first half. The 14th episode had 0.96 million viewers, an unusually small audience. The series finale on July 30, 2015, had 1.64 million viewers.

Awards and nominations

International broadcast

Spin-off
On February 25, 2015, Nickelodeon announced a spin-off titled WITS Academy. It is a daily strip about the comedic adventures of witches- and wizards-in-training based on the third season of Grachi, and it premiered on October 5, 2015, ending on October 30, 2015. It was announced by Daniela Nieves that the show was not renewed for a second season, thus making the season 1 finale its series finale. The series is created by Catharina Ledeboer, produced by Viacom International, and executive produced by Tatiana Rodriguez.

References

External links
 
 

2014 American television series debuts
2015 American television series endings
2010s American comedy-drama television series
2010s American high school television series
2010s American single-camera sitcoms
2010s American teen drama television series
2010s American teen sitcoms
2010s Nickelodeon original programming
YTV (Canadian TV channel) original programming
English-language television shows
Television shows set in Miami
Television about magic
Witchcraft in television
Wizards in television
American telenovelas
American television spin-offs
Latino sitcoms
Television series about teenagers
Grachi